Ricky was an English indie rock band.

Career
Ricky formed in Portsmouth, England in the autumn of 2000. The band's first release was a self-funded mini-album, released in January 2002,  titled You Set The Scene, named after the last track on Forever Changes, an album by Love. The record gained strong reviews, but the band didn’t realise the commercial success the press attention suggested. 

Between 2004 and 2006, they had a number of small chart hits on the Garcia and Beat Crazy record labels, including a Top 40 hit in January 2005 with "Stop Knocking The Walls Down". This song was a double-A sided single, backed with "The Journey" by  Ian Prowse's band Amsterdam and would give Ricky their only week in the Top 40.

In 2006, they released "We Are England", a song celebrating the national team in time for the 2006 FIFA World Cup, but unlike Stan Boardman's "World Cup Song" or Sham 69's "Hurry Up England", it failed to reach the Top 40 in the singles chart of June-July 2006. Later in 2006, Ricky disbanded.

Discography

Albums
You Set the Scene (January 2002)
The Summer Sun Still Echoes (March 2004), re-released (October 2004)
'High Speed Silence' (recorded but unreleased - although promotional CD's do exist)

Singles
"Sunset View" (March 2003)
"That Extra Mile" / "Beat Out the Best In Me" (September 2004) - #50 UK; #10 UK Indie
"Stop Knocking The Walls Down" (January 2005 - split single with Amsterdam) - #32 UK; #8 UK Indie
"We Are England" (June 2006) - #54 UK; #3 UK Indie

References

English rock music groups